The Recruit is an Australian rules football reality television series that aired on Fox8 from 16 July 2014 to 21 September 2016.  

The winner of the show was drafted to an Australian Football League (AFL) club's rookie list via a special draft in September at the end of each series. They were listed as a Category B rookie (i.e. the same as an international player or someone who had not played for more than three years).

The first series was hosted by Ryan Fitzgerald and featured Michael Voss as the head coach. Mick Malthouse replaced Voss as head coach for the second series. Other key members of the program are former Hawthorn player Ben Dixon as Assistant Coach, Leigh Russell as the Elite Performance Manager, and Port Adelaide fitness coach Darren Burgess as the High Performance Coach.

Contestants must not have been previously selected to an AFL club list, be over 20 years of age, and have not played in a senior state league in the past two years.

On 18 September 2014, the series was renewed for a second season. Originally scheduled to air in 2015, it was later announced it would air in 2016 due to multiple factors, one of which was the departure of Voss as coach.

On 3 August 2015, it was announced Gary Buckenara would be a scout in the second season, and that Fitzgerald will not return as host (although he did return as host for the live finale).  The second and final season began on 20 July 2016.

Series overview

Season 1

Contestants
The final squad of 13 players was selected from 50 finalists.

Season 1 episodes (2014)

Season 2

Contestants
The final squad of 15 players was selected from 50 finalists.

Season 2 episodes (2016)

Guests

See also

 List of Australian television series

References

External links

Fox8 original programming
Australian rules football television series
2010s Australian reality television series
2014 Australian television series debuts